Squalene—hopanol cyclase (squalene—hopene cyclase) is an enzyme with systematic name hopan-22-ol hydro-lyase. This enzyme catalyses the following chemical reaction

 hopan-22-ol  squalene + H2O

The enzyme produces the cyclization products hopene and hopanol.

References

External links 
 

EC 4.2.1